Horace B. Baker (January 23, 1869 – December 7, 1941) was an American politician who served as acting governor of the state of New Jersey. He was the nephew of Andrew D. Baker.

Baker was born in Elizabeth, New Jersey in 1869. Elected as a Republican, was a member of New Jersey Senate between 1894 and 1906, and became the Acting Governor of New Jersey and served between 1909 and 1910. Then he served as the Governor. He died in New York City in 1941.

See also
 List of governors of New Jersey

References

1869 births
1941 deaths
Politicians from Elizabeth, New Jersey
Republican Party governors of New Jersey
Republican Party New Jersey state senators